Lucius Afinius Gallus was a consul of the Roman Empire in the year 62 as the colleague of Publius Marius.

References

Imperial Roman consuls
1st-century Romans
Afinii